The following are lists of highest-grossing Japanese films.

 List of highest-grossing Japanese films
 List of highest-grossing films in Japan